Patharia railway station is a railway station in Patharia town of Madhya Pradesh. Its code is PHA. It serves Patharia town. The station consists of two platforms. Passenger, Express and Superfast trains halt here.

References

Railway stations in Damoh district
Jabalpur railway division